Denbury Hill (also known as Denbury Camp and Denbury Down) is the name of an Iron Age hill fort near the village of Denbury in Devon, England.

The fort is less than a kilometre south west of the village, occupying the entire hilltop of Denbury Down at 160 metres above sea level. It is surrounded on the south and east sides by high embankments. In the centre of the enclosure there are two large burial mounds.

The name Denbury means burh of the men of Devon, and the hill fort was probably re-occupied some time after the Romans left England and before the Norman conquest: it may have been used by the British as a centre of resistance against the Saxons, or it may have been occupied by the Saxons themselves. We do not know which because it has not been excavated.

According to legend, in common with similar locations, a great deal of gold is reputedly buried beneath the site. Theo Brown cited this couplet:
    Whoever delves in Denbury Down
    Is sure to find a golden crown.
And this one was mentioned by William Crossing in 1911:
    If Denbury Down the level were,
    England might plough with golden share.

Notes

References

Hill forts in Devon